The Congolese Diplomatic Academy is an institute for training diplomats of the Ministry of Foreign Affairs and International Cooperation of the Democratic Republic of the Congo in Kinshasa. It was established in 2006 to improve the quality of the DRC's diplomatic corps, graduating 200 civil servants by 2009. The school cooperates with other institutions from abroad, including ones from France, South Africa, Russia, and the Netherlands.

The director of the academy, as of 2010, was Bonaventure Mpasi Makenga. In 2019 the director was Pierre André Ngekene Bus-Mbul, and as of 2022 the director was Djuma Kauzeni Rashidi. 

Among the staff was Galina M. Sidorova, a Russian diplomat who taught Russian language at the DRC Diplomatic Academy, currently working at the Institute of African Studies of the Russian Academy of Sciences.

References

2006 establishments in the Democratic Republic of the Congo
Education in Kinshasa
Foreign relations of the Democratic Republic of the Congo
Schools of international relations
Universities in the Democratic Republic of the Congo